Cry Wolf is a hair metal band formed in the San Francisco Bay Area in the mid-1980s. Originally named Heroes, the original band consisted of Tim Hall (vocals), Steve McKnight (guitar), Phil Deckard (bass), John Freixas (drums) and JC Crampton (keyboards).

Band members

Current members
Tim Hall – lead vocals
Steve McKnight – guitar, backing vocals
Phil Deckard – bass guitar, backing vocals
Paul Cancilla – drums

Former members

Dyna Shirasaki – lead vocals 
Susie Major – lead vocals
Raz Rox - Lead Vocals
Chris Moore – drums, percussion
James Gilmore – drums, percussion
John E. Link - drums, percussion
JC Crampton - keyboards
John Freixas - drums, percussion (1985–1986)

Discography
Studio albums
Cry Wolf (1989)
Crunch (1990)
Twenty Ten (2010)

See also
List of glam metal bands and artists

References

 Rock City News, Los Angeles, 1990 vol 8 no 13, pages 70–71

External links
Reverbnation page

1985 establishments in California
Glam metal musical groups from California
Heavy metal musical groups from California
Musical groups established in 1985
Musical groups disestablished in 1994